Andrey Mikhailovich Makarov (born July 22, 1954, Moscow, RSFSR, USSR) is a  Soviet and  Russian  lawyer, Russian politician, deputy of the State Duma in 1993-1999 and from 2003 to the present, member of the faction United Russia, TV presenter. One of the authors of the first part of the Taxation in Russia.

Biography 
He was born on July 22, 1954 in Moscow.

In 1976, he graduated from the law faculty of the Moscow State University of M.V. Lomonosov. He taught at the Law Faculty of Moscow State University of M.V. Lomonosov, after dismissal he worked at the All-Union Scientific Research Institute of the Ministry of Internal Affairs of the USSR, where he was tacitly considered as acting speechwriter of Yuri Churbanov.

In 1979, he defended his PhD in Law.  The thesis was on the use of scientific and technical means in criminal proceedings. He defended it at the Institute of the Ministry of Internal Affairs (1979).

In 1983-1993, the lawyer at the Moscow City Bar Association. He defended Yu. M. Churbanov in the “cotton business”. He was the public prosecutor in the case of Smirnov-Ostashvili, one of the leaders of the "Memory" society.  In 1992, the prosecutor at the meetings of the Constitutional Court of the Russian Federation, which considered the so-called “CPSU case”.

In 1990, he was the Director of the Legal Department of the Cultural Initiative Foundation (Soros Foundation). In 1992 he headed the Cultural Initiative Foundation.

In 1993, he was a member of the working group for drafting of the new Constitution of the Russian Federation.

Property and income 
According to the income declaration for 2011 the amount of Andrei Makarov’s annual income amounted to 7 525 109 rubbles, and of his wife to 75 331 329, of his child to 92 482; the MP and his family members own two lands of 0.25 hectares for private subsidiary farming, 0.18 hectares of land for gardening, two 0.14 hectares of land for individual residential construction and a 318 m² residential building in Spain, a residential building of 746 m² and apartments of 190 and 53 m² in Russia. According to the newspaper Vedomosti, in Spain Makarov owns two  plots of 0.29 ha.

In the Makarov declaration for 2014 and for the subsequent years, the spouse is absent. The Makarov’s income for 2014, according to the declaration, amounted to 3,922,886.48 rubles, he is owned an apartment of 53 sq.m. and the car Lexus LS 460. In the declaration for 2014, Makarov’s child received an income of 36,805.88 rubles, owns two plots in Spain: a plot of land for individual residential construction (common shared property, 1/2) 1,489.00 sq.m. and a land for individual residential construction (common shared property, 1/2) 1426.00 sq.m., as well as a house - common shared property, 1/2 318.07 sq.m.

In 2015, Makarov received an income of 4,744,151.65 rubles; he owned an apartment of 53 sq.m. and the Lexus LS 460. The child received an income of 77,956.91 rubles, owns two plots in Spain: land for individual residential construction (common shared property, 1/2) 1489.00 sq.m. and the land for individual residential construction (common shared property, 1/2) 1426.00 sq.m., and also to the house - common shared property, 1/2 318.07 sq.m.

In 2016, the child disappeared from the declaration; Makarov’s income amounted to 6,150,299.66 rubles, and to the apartment of 53 sq.m. and to the car Lexus LS 460.

Awards 
 Russian Federation Presidential Certificate of Honour (2013) —  for his great contribution to the development of the Russian parliamentary and active legislative activity
 Order of Honour (2014) — for active legislative activity and many years of diligent work

References

External links
 Андрей Макаров на сайте   Первого канала

1954 births
Living people
Lawyers from Moscow
United Russia politicians
Soviet lawyers
Russian television presenters
Recipients of the Order of Honour (Russia)
21st-century Russian lawyers
20th-century Russian lawyers
21st-century Russian politicians
20th-century Russian politicians
Academic staff of Moscow State University
First convocation members of the State Duma (Russian Federation)
Second convocation members of the State Duma (Russian Federation)
Fourth convocation members of the State Duma (Russian Federation)
Fifth convocation members of the State Duma (Russian Federation)
Sixth convocation members of the State Duma (Russian Federation)
Seventh convocation members of the State Duma (Russian Federation)
Eighth convocation members of the State Duma (Russian Federation)